Lamia Boumehdi is a Moroccan football manager and former player. She played as a defender and has captained the Morocco women's national team.

Club career
Boumehdi has played for FC Berrechid in Morocco.

International career
Boumehdi capped for Morocco at senior level during the 2000 African Women's Championship.

Managerial career
Boumehdi has coached the Morocco women's national under-20 football team.

See also
 List of Morocco women's international footballers

References

External links

Living people
People from Berrechid
Moroccan women's footballers
Women's association football defenders
Morocco women's international footballers
Moroccan football managers
Female association football managers
Women's association football managers
Year of birth missing (living people)